Typica may refer to:
 Typica, a liturgical service of the Eastern Orthodox Church
 The plural of typicon
 Editio typica, a form of text used in the Catholic Church as an official source text of a particular document
 Typica (program), software for coffee roasters